Sam Foley (born 1977) is a contemporary New Zealand landscape painter.

His often large, finely detailed paintings portray nature and urban landscapes, combining aspects of hyper-realism and photo-realism.

Life and career 
Sam Foley was born in Wellington, New Zealand and in 1998 received his Bachelor of Fine Arts from the Otago School of Art in Dunedin. In 2007 he won a Merit Award (1st equal) at the Parklane Art Awards in Auckland, with his painting Pathway at Night. He was awarded twice (2008 – 2009) the Peoples Choice Award at the Norfolk House Realist Invitational in Dunedin, and twice (2009 – 2010) the Peoples Choice Award at The Wallace Art Awards in Auckland. In 2013 he won The Kaipara Wallace Arts Trust Award, with his painting Tilting at the Beast. The award founder and arts patron Sir James Wallace acquired one of Foley's kinetic paintings entitled Opoho Intersection No.1.

Since 2008 he has visited Europe regularly, spending extensive periods of time in Berlin and attending residencies in Norway and Switzerland. His works can be found in several private and public art collections such as the Dunedin International Airport collection, the Historic Places Trust of New South Wales in Australia, The ASB Bank in Auckland, The Wallace Trust in Auckland, The Central Library and Salmond College in the University of Otago.

Moving Image Paintings 
In 2008 Foley embarked on a 10 week research tour in Europe where he visited more than 30 major museums and galleries. Most of the contemporary galleries had a dedicated moving image section which brought up the idea how to incorporate moving image onto his work. At the end of his research tour Foley returned to New Zealand and started experimenting in his studio with video projections onto his paintings. He recorded video footage of the landscapes he was painting and projected those onto the finished painting. The result was a 'moving image painting' which transports the viewer into the painting for a more immersive experience.

Selected exhibitions 

 2017 - Dowling Street, The Artist's Room, Dunedin, NZ
2016 - LAKE, Artbay Gallery, Queenstown, NZ
2016 - Rennande Vatn (Running Water), S9 Galeri, Oslo, Norway
2015 - Moving Image Paintings, Pataka Art + Museum, Porirua, NZ
2015 - Something About the Water, Galerie 9, Solothurn, Switzerland
2014 - Harbour, The Artist’s Room and Dowling St Studios, Dunedin, NZ
2014 - Kontraste, Galerie 9, Solothurn, Switzerland
2013 - Into the Deep, Whitespace, Auckland
2012 - Running Water, Dowling St Studios, Dunedin
2011 - Tiefschwarz, The Artist’s Room, Dunedin

Awards 

 2013 - The Kaipara Wallace Arts Trust Award
 2010 - Peoples Choice Award, The Wallace Art Awards, Auckland
 2009 - Peoples Choice Award, The Wallace Art Awards, Auckland
 2009 - Peoples Choice Award, Norfolk House Realist Invitational, Dunedin
 2008 - Peoples Choice Award, Norfolk House Realist Invitational, Dunedin
 2007 - Merit Award (1st equal), Parklane Art Awards, Auckland
 2006 - Highly commended, Park Lane Art Awards, Auckland
 2005 - The Downie Stewart Peoples Choice Award, Cleveland Art Awards, Dunedin
 2003 - Peoples Choice Award, Cleveland Art Awards, Dunedin
 1998 - Merit Award, Oil on Canvas, Southland Young Contemporaries, Invercargill

Works permanently displayed in collections 

 Ackerselva Day Study I - 2016 - The Wallace Arts Trust Collection
 Ackerselva Day Study II - 2016 - The Wallace Arts Trust Collection
 Urban Scrawl II - 2016 - The Wallace Arts Trust Collection
 Ackerselva Night Study VI - 2016 - The Wallace Arts Trust Collection
Te Tahi Bay - 2015 - Pataka Art + Museum
 Tilting at the Beast - 2012 - The Wallace Arts Trust Collection
 Otira Gorge 2011 - The Wallace Arts Trust Collection
Railway Yard, Ashburton - 2010 - Ashburton Art Gallery
 Edinburgh Study II - 2010 - The Wallace Arts Trust Collection
Intersection - 2008 - The Wallace Arts Trust Collection
 Registry Building - 2004 - University of Otago Art Collection
 Divergence, St Kilda Beach - 2002 - University of Otago Art Collection
 St Clair from St Kilda - 2002 - University of Otago Art Collection
Fallen Soldiers Memorial, Otago Peninsula - 2002 - University of Otago Art Collection
Old Lime Kiln, Otago Peninsula - 2002 - University of Otago Art Collection
Mapoutahi Pa Site, Dunedin - 2002 - University of Otago Art Collection
Wreck of the Miniwi - 2003 - Historic Places Trust of New South Wales
Flagstaff looking South - 2005 - Dunedin International Airport
On the Surface VII - 2008 - ASB Bank

References 

1977 births
Living people
People from Wellington City
New Zealand painters